The Withlacoochee Railway Company was incorporated under Florida state law chapter 4256, approved May 24, 1893, for the purpose of surveying, operating and maintaining a railroad from some point in or near the town of Madison, Madison County, Florida, upon the most practical route in a northerly direction to the line between the states of Florida and Georgia.

Owners
The company was owned by J. M. Wilkinson, E. L. Moore and Maxey Ashley.

See also
 List of defunct Florida railroads

References 

Defunct Florida railroads
Predecessors of the Southern Railway (U.S.)
Railway companies established in 1893
Railway companies disestablished in 1895
1893 establishments in Florida
1895 disestablishments in Florida